is a Japanese global pulp and paper trading company, first in Japan and third in the world by the amount of sales (sales in 2018 : ¥535.49B) after Veritiv Corporation (net sales in 2018 : $8.7B) and Central National-Gottesman (revenue in 2018 : $6.2B). Japan Pulp and Paper Company (JPP) distributes paper-related products and also operates real estate business.　In 2019, JPP acquired Birmingham-headquartered PREMIER PAPER GROUP (PPG) for ¥5.2B and made PPG into its affiliate with PPG's management team remaining in place and all the 480 employees being kept on following the acquisition.

Major activities
Import and export, sale, distribution and manufacturing of paper, paperboard, pulp, paper-related products
Real estate leasing; generation, sale and provision of electricity

Segments
 Japan Wholesaling
 Non-Japan Wholesaling
 Paper Manufacturing and Processing
 Resources and Environment
 Real Estate Leasing

References

1916 establishments in Japan
Companies listed on the Tokyo Stock Exchange
Pulp and paper companies of Japan